The 2011 Canoe Sprint European Championships was held on 17–19 June at Belgrade, Serbia.

Medal table

Medal overview

Men

Women

References

External links
Results

Canoe Sprint European Championships
Canoe Sprint European Championships
2011 Canoe Sprint European Championships
European Sprint Championships
Canoeing in Serbia
June 2011 sports events in Europe
2010s in Belgrade